The 34th Moscow International Film Festival was held from 21 to 30 June 2012.  Dukhless was selected as the opening gala film and closed with Beloved by Christophe Honoré. The Golden George was awarded to Junkhearts (2011) directed by Tinge Krishnan.

Jury
The Jury for the 34th Moscow International Film Festival announced on June 7, 2012.

Main Competition Jury
 Hector Babenco (Brazil – President of the Jury)
 Sergei Loban (Russia)
 Jean-Marc Barr (France)
 Adriana Chiesa Di Palma (Italy)
 Javor Gardev (Bulgaria)

Perspectives Competition Jury
 Marina Razbezhkina (Russia – Perspectives competition Jury)
 Sylvia Perel (Mexico)
 Darezhan Omirbayev (Kazakhstan)

Documentary Competition Jury
 Vladimir Evaldovich Eisner (Russia – Documentary competition Jury)
 Pawel Pawlikowski (Poland)
 Jon Alpert (USA)

Competition
The following films were selected for the main competition:

80 Million / 80 Millionow directed by Waldemar Krzystek
A Cherry on a Pomegranate Tree? / Shi Liu Shu Shang Ошу ying Tao directed by LI chen
A.C.A.B. directed by Stefano Sollima
Expiration Date / Fecha de caducidad directed by Kenya Marquez
Fire in Hell / Jioghwa directed by Lee Sang-woo
Growing in the Wind / Routedan dar Bad directed by Rahbar Ghanbari
Gulf Stream Under the Iceberg / Golfa straume zem ledus kalna directed by Jevgeņijs Paškevičs
July / Krapetz directed by Kiril Stankov
Junkhearts directed by Tinge Krishnan
Lonely Island / Üksik saar directed by Peeter Simm
Magnifica presenza directed by Ferzan Özpetek
Naked Harbour / Vuosaari directed by Aku Louhimies
Apostle / O Apóstolo directed by Fernando Cortizo
Rita's Last Fairy Tale / Poslednyaya skazka Rity directed by Renata Litvinova
The Door / Az ajtó? directed by István Szabó
The Horde / Орда directed by Andrei Proshkin
Vegetarian Cannibal / Ljudozder Vegetarijanac directed by Branko Schmidt

Perspectives competition
170 Hz
Amaro Amore
Ana-Bana
Bebop
City of Children / I poli ton paidion
Dr.Ketel
Everybody’s gone
Fourth Dimension
Garbage
Horizon / Tian Bian
If only everyone… / Yet’ye bolory…
The wreckers
Where is my mother tongue? / Ana Dilim Nerede

Documentary competition
Colors of Math
Searching for Sugarman
The Ambassador
The World before Her
Theatre Svoboda / Divadlo Svoboda
Tomorrow / Zavtra
TT3D: Closer to the Edge

Short film corner
Ash
Away / V Put
Brother / Broer
Jealousy
Man in Fear
Sirocco / Shluq
Taxi Karaoke
The Centrifuge Brain Project
The Metamorphosis

Awards
Winners for the 34th Moscow Film Festival has been announced on June 30, 2012.

Main Prize “Golden George” for the best film:
JUNKHEARTS (dir. Tinge Krishnan, UK)

Special Jury Prize “Silver George”:
FECHA DE CADUCIDAD (dir. Kenya Marquez, Mexico)
 
“Silver George” for the best director:
ANDREY PROSHKIN (“THE HORDE”, Russia)

“Silver George” for the best actor:
Eddie Marsan (“Junkhearts”, UK)

“Silver George” for the best actress:
ROZA HAIRULLINA (“THE HORDE”, Russia)

“Silver George” for the best film of the "Perspectives" competition:
THE WRECKERS (dir. D.R.HOOD, UK)
 
“Silver George” for the best film of the documentary competition:
SEARCHING FOR SUGARMAN (dir. Malik Bendjelloul, Sweden, UK)
 
Special Prize for An Outstanding Contribution To The World Cinema:
Tim Burton (USA)

Special Prize for The Outstanding Achievement In The Career Of Acting and Devotion To The Principles of K.Stanislavsky's school:
Catherine Deneuve (France)

See also
 2012 Cannes Film Festival
 66th British Academy Film Awards
 70th Golden Globe Awards
 2012 in film

References

External links
2012 Moscow International Film Festival: 2012 at Internet Movie Database
Official website

2012
2012 film festivals
2012 festivals in Asia
2012 festivals in Europe
Mos
2012 in Moscow
June 2012 events in Russia